Nikola Selaković (born 25 July 1995 in Smederevo, FR Yugoslavia is a Serbian rower.

References
 

1995 births
Living people
Serbian male rowers
European Rowing Championships medalists